Pericyma atrifusa is a moth of the  family Erebidae.

Distribution
It is found in Botswana, Kenya and South Africa.

Biology
The larvae feed on Fabaceae: Acacia senegal and Acacia tortilis

References 

Ophiusina
Moths of Africa
Moths described in 1902